The Mineral Information Institute (MII) is an American educational institute dedicated to teaching schoolchildren about minerals and mining from the perspective of the mining industry. It sometimes influences the choice of textbooks, and it states that its web site and other resources are linked to or referenced by a number of textbook publishers.

References

External links
Mineral Information Institute

Trade associations based in the United States